The 2011 Queensland Cup season was the 16th season of Queensland's top-level statewide rugby league competition run by the Queensland Rugby League. The competition, known as the Intrust Super Cup due to sponsorship from Intrust Super, featured 12 teams playing a 25-week-long season (including finals) from March to September.

The Wynnum Manly Seagulls won their first premiership after defeating the Tweed Heads Seagulls 16–10 in the Grand Final at Suncorp Stadium. Norths Devils'  Javarn White was named the competition's Player of the Year, winning the Courier Mail Medal.

Teams
In 2011, the lineup of teams remained unchanged for the third consecutive year. The Manly Sea Eagles cut ties with the Sunshine Coast Sea Eagles in November 2010 after they were denied from having feeder clubs in both the Queensland and New South Wales Cup competitions. The Melbourne Storm returned to having an affiliate in the Queensland Cup, forming a partnership with the Easts Tigers.

Ladder

Ladder progression

 Numbers highlighted in green indicate that the team finished the round inside the top 6.
 Numbers highlighted in blue indicates the team finished first on the ladder in that round.
 Numbers highlighted in red indicates the team finished last place on the ladder in that round.

Regular season

The 2011 Queensland Cup regular season featured 22 rounds.

Finals series

Grand Final

Tweed Heads were near unbeatable during the regular season, losing only 1 game and finishing 9 points clear of their nearest rivals to claim the minor premiership. Wynnum Manly started the season with six straight losses before finally entering the Top 6 in Round 18 and holding on to finish in 6th place and claiming the last spot in the finals series. Prior to the Grand Final the two sides had met each other three times during the 2011 season with Tweed defeating Wynnum Manly by 20 points in Round 5 and 40 points in Round 16, however Wynnum Manly did defeat Tweed Heads 24-12 in the semi finals.

First half
Tweed Heads were first on the board, crossing through hooker Tim Maccan, who pushed off four defenders to plant the ball in the corner. Brad Davis was the architect of the second try, selling the dummy to the Wynnum Manly defence and drawing the fullback before putting Cody Nelson over the line. Following an error by Tweed deep in their own half, Wynnum Manly took advantage, with halfback Matt Seamark putting through an inch-perfect grubber for fullback Jake Granville to score under the posts and cut the deficit to 10-6 at the break.

Second half
The second half saw Wynnum Manly take the lead in the 47th minute, when Seamark dived on a kick from Reece Blayney in the in-goal area to score. Wynnum Manly wrapped up the game in the 73rd minute when Shea Moylan crossed in the left-hand corner after a line break from Blayney. Wynnum Manly won their first ever Queensland Cup premiership, becoming the lowest ranked team (6th) to win the Grand Final. The win would be the first of back-to-back premierships for head coach Paul Green and his side.

Wynnum Manly fullback Jake Granville was awarded the Duncan Hall Medal.

Player statistics
The following statistics are correct as of the conclusion of Round 22.

Leading try scorers

Leading point scorers

End-of-season awards
 Courier Mail Medal (Best and Fairest): Javarn White ( Norths Devils)
 QANTAS Player of the Year (Coaches Award): Jake Granville ( Wynnum Manly Seagulls)
 Coach of the Year: Ben Anderson ( Tweed Heads Seagulls)
 Rookie of the Year: Josh Starling ( Tweed Heads Seagulls)
 Representative Player of the Year: Luke Capewell ( Queensland Residents,  Ipswich Jets)

See also

 Queensland Cup
 Queensland Rugby League

References

2011 in Australian rugby league
Queensland Cup